Allie Legg (née Dragoo; born December 17, 1989) is an American former professional racing cyclist, who rode professionally between 2014 and 2019. She rode in the women's team time trial at the 2015 UCI Road World Championships.

She started her bike racing career in BMX, competing for thirteen years including two as a professional. She was offered a collegiate golf scholarship, but turned it down in order to pursue cycle racing, and graduated from Marian University, Indiana with a degree in Education and Physical Education in May 2014.

Major results

2014
 3rd Andersen Banducci Twilight Criterium
 4th Overall Valley of the Sun
2015
 1st Overall Chico Stage Race
1st Stage 3 (ITT)
 1st Andersen Banducci Twilight Criterium
 2nd Overall Valley of the Sun
 3rd Overall San Dimas Stage Race
 3rd Overall Redlands Bicycle Classic
 5th Team time trial, UCI Road World Championships
 5th Overall Tour of Utah
1st Stage 1
 5th Overall Tour of Colorado
 7th Overall Tour of the Gila
 National Road Championships
8th Time trial
9th Road race
2016
 1st Overall Valley of the Sun
1st Stage 1 (ITT)
 1st Overall Chico Stage Race
1st Stage 3 (ITT)
 1st Stage 3 Energiewacht Tour
 1st Stage 2 (TTT) Tour of California
 5th Team time trial, UCI Road World Championships
 6th Overall Cascade Cycling Classic
2017
 1st Overall Cascade Cycling Classic
 9th Overall Tour of Colorado
2018
 1st Overall Chico Stage Race
1st Stage 3 (ITT)
 6th Chrono Gatineau
 7th Overall Valley of the Sun
2019
 7th Chrono Kristin Armstrong

References

External links
 

1989 births
Living people
American female cyclists
Marian University (Indiana) people
Sportspeople from Grand Rapids, Michigan
21st-century American women